Robert Halley (13 August 1796 – 18 August 1876) was an English Congregational minister and abolitionist. He was noted for his association with the politics of Repeal of the Corn Laws, and became Classical Tutor at Highbury College and Principal of New College, St John's Wood, London.

Early life

Robert Halley was born in Blackheath near London in 1796. His father, Robert Halley senior, was the younger son of a farming family, and had moved south from Perthshire, Scotland, in his youth to make his own way in life, living for a while as head gardener to a family in Dorset, and then becoming a nurseryman at Blackheath. Halley's mother was Ann Bellows of Bere Regis, Dorset. She died whilst Robert was very young and he was sent to Dorset to live with his maternal uncle, though returning a few years later to Blackheath to attend Maze Hill School and then, in 1810, begin working for his father as a nurseryman. 

In 1811, his father married for a second time. Shortly after, Robert, his brothers and sisters, his nurseryman father, and stepmother, were joined by the second Mrs Halley's only daughter. The family, now three boys and two girls, were soon, however, again to be deprived of a mother; for the second Mrs Halley then died.

Into this upbringing, where death was no stranger, Robert was also influenced by his father's piety. On settling at Blackheath for employment, Halley had at first regularly walked into London each Sunday dutifully to attend the Presbyterian Chapel in Oxenden Street. Finding this too much for work the next day, he looked for a closer chapel, but nevertheless took upon himself a lengthy walk to the one of his choice - Butt Lane Meeting House (later named High Street Chapel) in Deptford where he became a deacon. 

Robert would walk with his father across the heath every Sunday morning, attend the chapel, take lunch there, then visit the sick and poor before walking back across the heath. Robert began to look for a career in the dissenting chapels, and though not being successful in applying to Hoxton Academy, he was offered a place at Homerton College in 1816, under the tutorship of John Pye Smith, for a six-year course.

Life as a Pastor
Halley was ordained on 11 June 1822 as pastor of a new independent congregation at St. Neot's, Huntingdonshire. Four years later, in 1826 when the new Highbury College opened near London, he was invited to work as Classical Tutor at the college. His academic work here led to an unsolicited degree of D.D. from Princeton College, New Jersey in 1834. 

In the previous year he had become noted in the abolition movement, delivering a sermon on The Sinfulness of Colonial Slavery at the Meeting House of his former tutor, John Pye Smith of Hackney.  In 1839 he returned to the ministry, as pastor of Mosley Street Chapel, Manchester. Here became closely associated with the Anti-Corn Law movement, supporting the cause for repeal that became strong amongst the working-class of the northern industrial cities, as well as amongst the northern cities' Members of Parliament and their well-to-do city electorates (which after the 1832 Reform Act gave the vote to about eleven percent of the population). 

One of Halley's sons, Jacob John (1834-1910) also became a minister (he was a noted Congregational minister in Australia). Another son Dr. Ebenezer Halley (born Highbury College, London in 1836 - died Lawrence, Otago, New Zealand, 22 November 1875)
was the Assistant Surgeon to the Melbourne Gaol in Australia and later a doctor in Lawrence.

Life as an Academic
In later life, Halley became Principal of New College, London (from 1857 to 1872), succeeding John Harris; and wrote a number of printed books and sermons.

Death and memorial
Halley died in 1876. His memorial, a stone coffin tomb with hipped top, stands at Abney Park Cemetery, in Stoke Newington, London.

Select List of Published Works
 Halley, Rev. Robert (1833) The Sinfulness of Colonial Slavery 
 Halley, Rev. Dr. Robert (1869) Lancashire, its puritanism and Nonconformity, 2 vols
 Halley, Rev. Robert (1861) Memoir of Thomas Goodwin D.D., prefixed to Goodwin's Works

Further reading
 
 Halley, Robert M.A. (1879), A Short Biography of Rev. Robert Halley D.D., London
 Halley, Rev. Dr. Robert (1833) The Sinfulness of Colonial Slavery, London [republished c.2006 by Cornell University Library, USA]
Biodata, adb.online.anu.edu. Accessed 18 December 2022.

English abolitionists
English Congregationalist ministers
1796 births
1876 deaths
Burials at Abney Park Cemetery
19th-century Congregationalist ministers
Academics of former colleges of the University of London
English theologians
Alumni of Homerton College, Cambridge
Congregationalist abolitionists